Bandar Torkaman, formerly known as  Bandar Shah, is a city and capital of Torkaman County, Golestan Province, Iran. At the 2006 census its population was 45,045, in 9,755 families.

Bandar Torkaman is a port on the Caspian Sea.

Economy
The economy is based on agriculture, handicrafts, animal husbandry, fishing and tourism, with 50 percent of Iranian caviar being extracted near this port. Ashouradeh Island attracts many tourists. Bandar Torkaman is also called "Cotton Island". Cotton is grown abundantly in the harbor which makes Bandar Torkaman a strategic cotton-cultivator in the country.

Tourism

In the past, the city was equipped with three big jetties and was used by the Allied Forces during the World War II for transportation of equipment. However, two jetties have sunk and presently, due to poor equipment and the gradual decline of water, Bandar Torkaman possesses only one jetty, is no longer bustling and is mostly used to communicate with Ashouradeh Island. 
During Norouz (New Iranian Year) and summers, this jetty is full of seasonal merchants who bring Turkman fabricated objects to the city for sale. Ashouradeh Island is a main attraction in the region.

Environment
During the colder months of the year, the Gomishan lagoon, Bandar Torkaman's highly biodiverse wetland habitat, hosts many thousands of migrating birds from icy Siberia, far to the northeast, including cranes, ducks, storks and geese.

Carpets
Carpet-weaving is a major source of income for the inhabitants. Turkmen cushions, carpets, prayer rugs, and felt mats woven in this region are not only sold in other cities within Iran but are also exported throughout the world (See Persian rugs). Turkmen cushions and carpets are known for their ancient patterns. Jajim (rustic textiles, similar to mats or blankets), and Palas (homespun woolen cloth), woven by local craftspeople, are yet further regional art-forms which showcase the time-honoured traditions and skills of the Turkmen of northeastern Iran, who share a common cultural heritage with their neighbors in nearby Turkmenistan.

Culture

Traditions
During the Ramadan mourning season the residents rejoice, feast, and spray rose water and perfume in the mosques. On the first day of Ramazan they cook special oily bread and distribute them in the mosques and to neighbors. Also on the night of Ghadr, the young ones receive presents from their elders, mostly in the form of cash. Then they go to the market and buy sweetmeats and candy and hold a feast in their homes.

In Bandar Torkaman, the 'Laleh' singing ceremony has been performed for many centuries. Women assemble and sing Laleh' which is a melancholy song. Its composer is unknown, but the song laments the hard life of brides in ancient times among Turkmans, historical events, love of life, and the pain of separation from the tribe and homeland. In old times the brides were separated from their natives tribes and were taken to distant regions by their husbands and often never again saw their parents. Thus in their loneliness it was the following charming and melancholy song which gave them comfort:

Tell me if the mountain beside our village still stands? Are the jungles there still full of fruit? O white birds which are flying, tell me if my clan and friends are safe and sound.

For five days during Fitr or Qorban (sacrifice) holidays the Turkman rejoice and feast. They open their house gates to permit any stranger who is passing the town to step into the house and join their feast.

When a child is being born they repeat the old proverb which says: "If the newborn is a son he will become a farmer and if a girl she will become carpet weaver." This shows the importance they attach to farming and carpet weaving.

In the past, when Turkman tribesmen moved from one place to another, they did not carry some of their heavy belongings and instead buried them in graves; because of the sanctity of graveyards, nobody dared to steal the items.

When courting, the groom-to-be must prepare a Qatlama, which is a special sweetmeat. If the bride's family accepts the Qatlama, it means that they agree to the wedding. The family of the bride-groom adorns a camel with ornamented clothes and lays a litter on it to mount the bride over the animal and carry her to the groom's house. The camel is driven by a respected elder among the tribe and at times by the groom himself. However, with the arrival of cars, this tradition has been abandoned in most cities; but in remote mountainous regions such as Gelidagh, Maraveh tappeh, Dashli boroon and Kalaleh, the bride is still carried away according to the tradition.

Turkmans hold an interesting ceremony for circumcision. On that occasion they hold a big feast and invite all their relatives, cook the famous Bulamaq and after cooking they mix it with sugar to sweeten it.

In this city, the people who arrive at the age of 63 hold a feast for having attained the age of the Islamic prophet Muhammad and kill a white sheep to serve the guests.

Food

The Turkmans have varied dishes and in there is also a special place where a specific dish is cooked. Chekdirmeh and Soozmeh are the daily food of the Turkmans which are normally made of rice and oil. Among other dishes one can refer to are Chourba (Shourba), which is made of vegetable and boiled meat; Oonash, a soup made of dough strings or vermicelli; Qateqliash, which is a kind of soup made of yoghurt, rice and garlic; Swidliash, composed of milk and rice; Bulamaq, composed of oil and rice, and Qatoorqa, made of smoked and ground wheat, rice and sugar.

Dress
Traditional dress includes a skin cap and a loose red garment called Doon for men, Kooyink a loose skirt for women, Yaliq (worn by women at home instead of chador), and Boorik, a hat worn by girls before marriage, are the only traditional items which have survived in this northern port. Normally after marriage the girl replaces Boorik with Alangi which is another hat.

Sports and recreation
Horse racing is the most important recreation in Bandar Torkaman which takes place in the spring and autumn. The competition is held in the main racing field which is about 100 hectares in size. The horse racing competition in Bandar Torkaman has many admirers in the country, especially in Tehran and Gonbade Kavoos. Even fans from the Persian Gulf States visit Bandar Torkaman to watch the races.
 
One of the favorite sports among the Turkmans is the traditional Goorehesh wrestling in which two rivals wrestle with each other without age or weight limitation. They take hold of each other's belt and the one who succeeds to lay the rival's back on the ground is pronounced winner and receives a present called Bayraq, which is either a ram or ewe. Ram is a symbol of uprightness and bravery among Turkmans and is much respected by them. To praise the strength and valor of a youth, he is said to resemble a ram.

Dagger (sword) play is another popular sport among Turkman youth. This is a religious/mystical ceremony in which the youth wear loose colorful garments, congregate in a field and raise their hands on their heads in the form of prayer. The man who bears the sword sings musical odes with a charming voice and the ceremony continues until they tighten their circle into a knot. The sword bearer then raises the sword as a token of valor and other members firmly grasp each other's hands as a token of valor and solidarity.

References

External links

Official Website
Bandar-e Torkaman entry in Encyclopaedia Iranica

Populated places in Torkaman County
Cities in Golestan Province
Port cities and towns in Iran
Populated places on the Caspian Sea